James Albert Beck (August 11, 1916 – May 3, 1956) was an American country music talent agent, record promoter, recording studio owner, A&R engineer, record producer, and music publisher from Dallas, Texas. Born in Marshall, Texas, Beck is credited with discovering and, in 1950, being the first to record Lefty Frizzell.  He is also credited for introducing Frizzell and Ray Price to Frank Jones (1926–2005) of Columbia Records, which led to their first major recording contracts.  Marty Robbins recorded his first hit — "I'll Go on Alone" — at Beck's studio.  Beck's studio also recorded a few hits by Carl Smith at his studio.  Record labels and producers who recorded at Jim Beck Studios included Decca (via Paul Cohen), Bullet, King, Imperial, and Columbia Records.  Between 1954 and 1956, Frankie Miller recorded a series of singles for Columbia at Beck's studio.

Jim Beck Studio 
Beck built his second studio – the "Jim Beck Studio" – in 1950 at 1101 Ross Avenue in Dallas.  His first studio had been on Main Street in Dallas.  Norman Petty, who later built and ran his own recording studio, worked as a part-time recording engineer at the Jim Beck Studio.

Jim Beck Studio recording artists and session musicians

 Charlie Adams (born 1920)
 Charline Arthur (1929–1987) †
 Lee Bell (de) (born 1927) †
 Mac Curtis (1939–2013) †
 Lefty Frizzell (1928–1975) †
 Johnny Gimble (1926–2015) †
 Rudy Grayzell (aka Rudy Gray; né  Rudolph Paiz Jimenez; 1933-2019) † 
 Buck Griffin (1923–2009) †
 Jimmy Heap (né James Arthur Heap; 1922–1977) †
 Gene Henslee (de)
 Johnny Hicks (né John Kenneth Hicks; 1918–1997)
 George Jones (1931–2013) †
 Neal Jones (Neal Gordan "Tywhop" Jones; 1922–2005)
 Merle Kilgore (1934–2005) †
 Sid King and the Five Strings (de) (né Albert Sidney Erwin; born 1936)
 Maddox Brothers and Rose
 Frankie Miller (born 1931) 
 Willie Nelson (born 1933) 
 Hoyle Nix (1918–1985) †
 Roy Orbison (1936–1988) †
 Leon Payne (1917–1969) 
 Webb Pierce (1921–1991) †
 Ray Price (1926–2013) †
 Jim Reeves (1923–1964) †
 Leon Rhodes (born 1932) †
 Marty Robbins (1925–1982) †
 Carl Smith (1927–2010) †
 Hank Thompson (1925–2007) †
 Floyd Tillman (1914–2003) †
 Billy Walker (1929–2006) †
 Lew Williams (1934-2019) †

Producers who used Jim Beck Studios
 Lew Chudd (1911–1998) – Imperial Records
 Paul Cohen (1908–1970) – Decca Records
 Don Law (1902–1982) – Columbia Records

Engineers
 Norman Petty (1927–1984)
 Jimmy Rollins

Note † signifies artists who recorded or worked studio sessions at Jim Beck Studio (Partial Listing)

Death 
Jim Beck died on May 3, 1956, at Baylor Hospital, after collapsing at his recording studio from accidentally inhaling carbon tetrachloride fumes while he and his assistant Jimmy Rollins were cleaning recording equipment.

References 

American audio engineers
Record producers from Texas
1916 births
1956 deaths
People from Dallas
American country music record labels
Accidental deaths in Texas
20th-century American businesspeople
Deaths by poisoning
20th-century American engineers